The Sony α NEX-7 is a digital camera announced 24 August 2011 by Sony. It is a mirrorless interchangeable lens camera and as such inherits a smaller body form factor than a traditional digital single-lens reflex camera, while still retaining the sensor size and features of an APS-C-sized model. It is targeted at experienced users, enthusiasts and professionals. It is replaced by the ILCE-6000 (α6000).

Features
Being targeted at experienced users, enthusiasts and professionals, the Sony NEX-7 offers features relevant to them. Mainly, it integrates a 24.3 megapixels APS-C sensor, videos 1920×1080p at 60 frame/s in AVCHD 2 and 10 fps stills shooting. It's built in a robust magnesium alloy and incorporates an XGA OLED electronic viewfinder with 2.4 million dots resolution.
The camera's specifications are as follows:
24 megapixel APS-C CMOS image sensor
ISO 100-16000
2.4 million dot OLED Electronic View Finder (EVF)
Electronic first-curtain shutter (for faster response time)
1080p 60 HD video recording with built-in mic (stereo)
Rear screen with tilt feature
Built-in flash and alpha hotshoe
remote control receiver (infra-red)
External mic input

Reception
Albeit being delayed for a few months because of 2011's Thai floods, the α NEX-7 was very well received by critics and users. In regions like Hong Kong, α NEX-7 was always running out of stock. DPreview.com and PhotographyBlog gave it their highest awards, with the highest score ever attained by an APS class camera. α NEX-7 also won the best camera in Camera Grand Prix 2012 under professional catalog, which was voted by a professional community consisting of 57 council members from the professional press field of the Camera Journal Press Club.

Image quality
At the time of its release, the Sony Alpha NEX-7 had the best image quality among any mirrorless interchangeable-lens compact camera which had been tested by DxO Labs and also the best APS-C Sensor camera from Sony.  Sony α65, Sony α77 and NEX-7 have similar sensors and received DxOMark Overall Scores of 74, 78, and 81, respectively.  The image quality of NEX-7 can be comparable with Nikon D7000 (score 80) and Pentax K-5 (score 82).

Hasselblad Lunar
In September 2012, the Swedish camera manufacturer Hasselblad announced a collaboration with Sony and a mirrorless compact camera at photokina 2012 in Cologne, Germany. This camera, named Lunar, is based on the Sony NEX-7 with identical key specifications, but with aesthetic differences in exterior design and menu system. In January 2014, Hasselblad announced another cosmetic variant of the camera, limited to 200 units, named the Lunar Limited Edition.

See also
List of Sony E-mount cameras
Sony NEX-5
Sony α6000

References

NEX-7
NEX-7
Live-preview digital cameras